Pakruojis Manor is a former residential manor 2 kilometers from Pakruojis, Lithuania, on the right bank of the Kruoja river. Built in the 19th century currently it is reconstructed and used as a hotel, restaurant and a tourist attraction.

Gallery

References

Manor houses in Lithuania
Classicism architecture in Lithuania